Farm to Market Road 1325 (FM 1325) is a  roadway located in Travis and Williamson counties of Texas. Along much of its length it is referred to as Burnet Road.

History 

The name Burnet Road derives from the fact that the road once formed part of a highway between Austin and Burnet.

FM 1325 was designated on July 14, 1949 from US 81(now IH-35) to SH 29(now US 183). The segment between I-35 and proposed SH 45 was redesignated as part of State Highway 45 on August 25, 2003.

Route description 

FM 1325 has three main segments. The first begins at an intersection with US 183 in north Austin. Here, FM 1325 is named Burnet Road (pronounced burn-it) and is a four-lane controlled roadway. It proceeds north  to an intersection with Loop 1 (Mopac Expressway).

North of FM 734 (Parmer Lane), the main lanes of Mopac Expressway become a limited-access toll road. The frontage road here uses the FM 1325 and Loop 1 designations.

North of Merilltown Road, FM 1325 is once again named Burnet Road and is a four-lane controlled roadway.

As of June 27, 1995, FM 1325 was officially designated Urban Road 1325 (UR 1325), but on November 15, 2018, the road was redesignated back to FM 1325.

Junction list

References

1325
Transportation in Austin, Texas
Transportation in Travis County, Texas
Transportation in Williamson County, Texas